White is an unincorporated community in Fayette County, Pennsylvania, United States. White has a post office with ZIP code 15490, which opened on June 21, 1883.

References

Unincorporated communities in Fayette County, Pennsylvania
Unincorporated communities in Pennsylvania